Ribes laurifolium, the laurel-leaved currant, is a species of flowering plant in the family Grossulariaceae, native to China, in Guizhou, West Sichuan and Yunnan.

Overview
These are followed on female plants by red fruits turning black in autumn. 

In gardens it is a suitable subject for a sunny, sheltered spot in reliably moist soil.

References

laurifolium
Flora of China